Ishino is a Japanese surname. Notable people with the surname include:

, Japanese speed skater
Mako Ishino (born 1961), Japanese singer and actress
Mami Ishino (born 1983), Japanese hurdler
, Japanese handball player
Ryuzou Ishino (born 1962), Japanese voice actor
Takkyu Ishino (born 1967), Japanese composer and music producer
Yōko Ishino (born 1968), Japanese actress
Yoshizumi Ishino (born 1959), Japanese molecular biologist, known for his discovering the DNA sequence of CRISPR

See also 
 Marin Ishino, alias of Yoshinori Sunahara, Japanese DJ
Ishino Station, railway station in Miki, Japan
Shimo-Ishino Station, abandoned railway station in Miki, Japan

Japanese-language surnames